Great Flood is a phrase used to describe the central event in any catastrophic flood. Some may be of the flood myth, whether historically accurate or mythological, while others are severe floods from around the world.

Great Flood may also refer to:

 Deluge (prehistoric), evidence for prehistoric floods sometimes individually referred to as great floods
 Flood myth and List of flood myths
 Genesis flood narrative in the Hebrew and Christian Bible, which includes Noah's Ark
 Great Flood (China), a flood dating from the 3rd millennium BC
 Great Flood of 1823, in Bedford
 Great Flood of 1844, the biggest flood ever recorded on the Missouri River and Upper Mississippi River in terms of discharge
 Great Flood of 1851 in the Midwest U.S.
 Great Flood of 1862, a flood in California, U.S.
 Great Sheffield Flood, a flood that devastated parts of Sheffield, England on 11 March 1864
 Great Flood of 1881, a natural disaster in Omaha, Nebraska
 Johnstown Flood, known locally as the Great Flood of 1889
 1910 Great Flood of Paris, a January 1910 flooding of the River Seine
 Great Flood of 1913, a natural disaster in Indiana, Ohio and ten other states in the U.S.
 Great Dayton Flood, part of the Great Flood of 1913
 Boston Molasses Disaster of 1919, known locally as the Great Molasses Flood
 Great Mississippi Flood of 1927, the most destructive river flood in U.S. history 
 Great Flood of 1951, a July 1951 flooding of the Kansas River in the U.S. state of Kansas
 Great Flood of 1968, a flood caused by very heavy rain that struck South East England and France in mid-September 1968
 Great Flood of 1993 in the Midwest US, one of the most costly and devastating in U.S. history

See also
 Great Deluge algorithm, a term in mathematics which uses an alternate form of the phrase